The discography of Mr. Mister, an American pop rock band, consists of four studio albums, two compilation albums, nine singles, and eight music videos. Mr. Mister was formed in 1982 by Richard Page and Steve George. Once the other two members, Steve Farris and Pat Mastelotto, joined the band, they were signed by RCA Records. In 1984, Mr. Mister released their debut album, I Wear the Face. The album peaked at number 170 on the Billboard 200 and did not chart internationally. I Wear the Face contained the single "Hunters of the Night", which peaked at number 57 on the  US Billboard Hot 100.

Welcome to the Real World (1985) was Mr. Mister's second and most successful album. It topped the Billboard 200 and was certified platinum by the Recording Industry Association of America (RIAA). Internationally, it charted within the top 10 on the Canadian, Norwegian, UK and Swiss Albums Chart. The album was certified three-times platinum by Music Canada and gold by the British Phonographic Industry. Welcome to the Real World produced four singles, including "Broken Wings" and "Kyrie" which topped the Billboard Hot 100 as well as the Canadian Singles Chart, and were certified gold by Music Canada.

Mr. Mister released their third studio album, Go On..., in 1987. It peaked at number 55 on the Billboard 200. It charted within the top 15 on the Swedish, Norwegian, and Swiss Albums Chart The album appeared on the Canadian Albums Chart and was certified gold by Music Canada. Go On... spawned four singles, but only "Something Real" appeared on music charts, appearing in the top 40 of the Billboard Hot 100 and the Canadian Singles Chart.

On the verge of releasing their fourth album, Pull, Steve Farris departed from the band and Mr. Mister broke up in 1989. From 1999 to 2010, seven compilation albums were released: Broken Wings: The Encore Collection (1999), Best Selection (1999), Broken Wings: Best of Mister Mister (1999), The Best of Mr. Mister (2001), Masters (2002), Broken Wings (2010). Pull was finally released in 2010. Mr. Mister followed the release of Pull with their eighth compilation album, Playlist: The Best of Mr. Mister (2011). None of the albums impacted any charts.

Albums

Studio albums

Compilation albums

Singles

Music videos

References

General
 
 

Specific

External links
 Mr. Mister discography at Allmusic.

Discographies of American artists
Pop music group discographies
Rock music group discographies